Girls' Love Stories was an American romance comic book magazine published by DC Comics in the United States. Started in 1949 as DC's first romance title, it ran for 180 issues, ending with the Nov-Dec 1973 issue. The stories covered such topics as girls worrying about getting a man, or marrying out of pressure, not love. Some of the early covers were photographs. The book's initial tagline was "True to Life!"

Writers for the title included Bob Kanigher, George Kashdan and Steven Pineda. Notable artists for Girls' Love Stories included George Tuska, Tony Abruzzo, Vince Colletta, Bill Draut, Frank Giacoia, Gil Kane, Bob Oksner, Art Peddy, Jay Scott Pike, John Romita Sr., Joe Rosen, John Rosenberger, Bernard Sachs, and Mike Sekowsky.

Editor Zena Brody began working on Girls' Love Stories in 1952.

Images taken from Girls' Love Stories have been used in some of Roy Lichtenstein's work.

References

External links 

1949 comics debuts
1973 comics endings
Bimonthly magazines published in the United States
Comics magazines published in the United States
Monthly magazines published in the United States
Defunct American comics
Eight times annually magazines published in the United States
Magazines established in 1949
Magazines disestablished in 1973
Romance comics